Patrik Olsson (born 27 September 1974) is a Swedish former footballer who played as a forward.

References

Association football forwards
Swedish footballers
Allsvenskan players
Malmö FF players
1974 births
Living people
People from Landskrona Municipality
Footballers from Skåne County